The 2011–12 New Mexico Lobos men's basketball team represented the University of New Mexico as a member of the Mountain West Conference. The Lobos are coached by fifth-year head coach Steve Alford and play their home games at The Pit in Albuquerque, New Mexico. They finished with a record of 28-7 overall, 10-4 in Mountain West play. They were co-champions of the 2012 Mountain West Regular Season Champions with San Diego State and won the 2012 Mountain West Conference men's basketball tournament. They earned a 5th seed in the west of the 2012 NCAA Division I men's basketball tournament. They lost in the third round to Louisville.

Recruiting

Roster

Departures
The Lobos lost their lone senior Dairese Gary, who was a four-year starter at point guard, who averaged 14.1 points per game, 5.5 assists per game and 3.2 rebounds per game. The Lobos also lost assistant coach Wyking Jones to an assistant coach position at the University of Louisville. Due to this, former Director of Basketball Operations Duane Broussard was promoted to assistant coach to replace Jones.

2011–12 Schedule
All times are Mountain

|-
!colspan=12 style=| Exhibition

|-
!colspan=9 style=| Regular season

|-
!colspan=9 style=| 2012 Mountain West Conference tournament

|-
!colspan=12 style=| 2012 NCAA tournament

References 

New Mexico Lobos men's basketball seasons
New Mexico
New Mexico
2011 in sports in New Mexico
2012 in sports in New Mexico